Zibechi is a surname. Notable people with the surname include:

Alfredo Zibechi (1895–1958), Uruguayan footballer
Raúl Zibechi (born 1952), Uruguayan journalist, writer, militant, and political theorist